The 2009 Liga Panameña de Fútbol season was the 22nd season of top-flight football in Panama.

Teams

Apertura I

First round

Standings

Results table

Final round

Semifinals
Semifinal 1

Semifinal 2

Final 

San Francisco qualified for 2009–10 CONCACAF Champions League.

Top goalscorers

Apertura II
The Apertura II (officially the 2009 Copa Digicel Apertura for sponsorship reasons) was the second tournament of the season. It started August 8 and ended on December 13. Árabe Unido were crowned champions of the Liga Panameña de Fútbol for the fifth time after beating Tauro 3-2 in the final. With this win Árabe Unido earned a spot in the 2010–11 CONCACAF Champions League.

First round

Standings

Results

Final round

Semifinals
Semifinal 1

Semifinal 2

Final 

Árabe Unido qualified for 2010–11 CONCACAF Champions League.

Top goalscorers

Relegation table
For the second year in a row, Alianza had the fewest points at the end of the season and had to face Liga Nacional de Ascenso champion Río Abajo. Just as last year, Alianza defeated Río Abajo and stayed in the LPF.

Promotion playoff

External links

Liga Panameña de Fútbol seasons
1
Pan
1
Pan